Vladimir Gorin (born 13 March 1961) is a Russian former basketball player. He competed in the men's tournament at the 1992 Summer Olympics.

References

External links
 

1961 births
Living people
Soviet men's basketball players
Russian men's basketball players
Olympic basketball players of the Unified Team
Basketball players at the 1992 Summer Olympics
People from Cherepovets
BC Spartak Saint Petersburg players
PBC CSKA Moscow players
Sportspeople from Vologda Oblast